Machang Town is a rural town in Puding County, Guizhou, China.

History
From 630 (Tang dynasty) to 1351 (Yuan dynasty), Machang was the county seat of Puding County.

Administrative division
As of January 2016, the town is divided into 39 villages and 1 community: Machang Community, Machang Village, Walong Village, Yunpan Village, Zhuchang Village, Xiaguan Village, Tuniu Village, Sancha Village, Shangguan Village, Longtan Village, Maolipo Village, Xiaping Village, Baiyang Village, Dahongyan Village, Xinchai Village, Songlin Village, Nahai Village, Yanjiao Village, Naxi Village, Dujia Village, Yanshang Village, Luolong Village, Dianzi Village, Dafenpo Village, Yakou Village, Xiaoxinzhai Village, Maluguan Village, Meiziguan Village, Tengjia Village, Sanhe Village, Banxiang Village, Tianba Village, Lanba Village, Bona Village, Danggu Village, Dafenba Village, Banpo Village, Lijia Village, Xiapai Village, Wanzhai Village, and Huangdian Village.

Geography
The Sancha River passes through the town east to west.

Economy
Myrica rubra, chestnut, pepper, grape, tea and ginkgo are the main cash crops in the region.

Transportation
The County Road 436 passes across the town east to west.

Attractions
Former Residence of Yuan Yuying is a famous scenic spot.

Dugong Pavilion is a cultural relics protection unit at county level.

References

Divisions of Puding County